Red Bull Battlegrounds is an annual United States Street Fighter V tournament. The tournament is the North American regional final of the Capcom Pro Tour and has been held twice:
Capcom Pro Tour 2016 regional finals
Capcom Pro Tour 2017 regional finals